Ballivián may refer to:

Places:
 Lake Ballivián, a Pleistocene high lake stage of Lake Titicaca
 José Ballivián Province, in the Beni department in northern Bolivia

People:
 José Ballivián (1805 – 1855), the 9th president of Bolivia from 1841 to 1847
 Adolfo Ballivián (1831 – 1874), the constitutional president of Bolivia from 1873 to 1874
 Hugo Ballivián (1901 – 1995), the de facto president of Bolivia from 1951 to 1952